The Group 3 racing class referred to a set of regulations for Grand Touring Cars competing in sportscar racing and rallying events regulated by the FIA. These regulations were active, in various forms, from 1957 to 1981

1957 to 1965

Regulations for Grand Touring Car racing were first defined when the FIA issued "Appendix J" for Touring Cars and GT Cars in 1954. The term Group 3 was in use by 1957 and by 1960 a minimum production of 100 units  in 12 consecutive months was required to allow homologation into Group 3. An FIA GT Cup  was instituted in 1960  and the GT category was featuring prominently in most rounds of the World Sports Car Championship. For 1962 the FIA replaced the World Sports Car Championship with an International Championship for GT Manufacturers, the new title being awarded each year through to 1965.

1966 to 1969
The FIA introduced a new Group 3 Grand Touring Car category in 1966 as part of a major revision of the Appendix J regulations. The production minimum required for Group 3 homologation was raised to 500 units and models such as the Ferrari 250 GTO and Porsche 904 were reclassified to the new Group 4 Sports Car category with its lower 50 unit minimum. The International Championship for GT Manufacturers was discontinued for 1966 and replaced by the International Championship for Sports Cars. GT cars were eligible to compete with the Group 4 cars in rounds of the International Championship for Sports Cars in 1966 and 1967 and then in the new International Championship for Makes with Group 4 Sports Cars and Group 6 Prototype-Sports Cars in 1968 and 1969. An International Cup for GT Cars was contested concurrently with the Makes Championship from 1968.

1970 to 1981
The creation of a new Group 4 Special Grand Touring Car category in 1970 saw Group 3 renamed as Series Production Grand Touring Cars and the minimum production requirement increased to 1000 units. Group 4, which allowed a greater degree of modification to the competing vehicles, had its minimum production requirement set at 500 units. Both GT categories were eligible to compete in the International Championship for Makes and then, from 1972, in the renamed World Championship of Makes. The International Cup for GT Cars also continued. In 1976 the World Championship of Makes was restricted to production derived cars (FIA Groups 1 to 5) and the International Cup for GT Cars was discontinued in that year.

The Group 3 Series Production Grand Touring Car category remained valid through to 1981 with the FIA introducing a new Group B Grand Touring car category the following year.

Rallying
In rallying, there were classes for Group 1, Group 2, Group 3 and Group 4 cars. The Lancia Beta Coupé, was homologated into both Group 3 and Group 4, with the Group 3 car running the mass-produced 8-valve engine, and the Group 4 version running the more powerful 16-valve.

Groups 1-9

See also
 World Rally Championship
 World Sportscar Championship

References

External links
 FIA Historic Racing Regulations
 Historic Appendix J Regulations
 FIA 1969 Appendix J
 1969 Group 3 homologation list at www.sovren.org

Sports car racing
Fédération Internationale de l'Automobile
24 Hours of Le Mans
Racing car classes